Kate's Secret is a 1986 American made-for-television drama film starring Meredith Baxter Birney, Ben Masters, Tracy Nelson, and Edward Asner about a seemingly "perfect" suburban housewife and mother who is secretly suffering from bulimia nervosa.

Synopsis
To those on the outside, Kate Stark (Meredith Baxter Birney) leads an idyllic life; a successful husband (Ben Masters), an adoring daughter (Summer Phoenix), and a beautiful home. But beneath the surface, her life is less than ideal; a husband preoccupied with his career, a critical and domineering mother (Georgann Johnson), and a dark secret that not even her closest friends know: Kate is bulimic. As the pressures in her life begin to mount, Kate obsessively diets and exercises, and habitually binges and purges while adroitly hiding her eating disorder from all those around her. When Kate's bulimia eventually leads to a frightening accident that makes it clear to everyone that her illness is dangerous not only to herself, but to those closest to her, she is committed to rehabilitation in order to face the inner turmoil at the root of her disorder.

Cast

References

External links

 
 Kate's Secret at MyLifetime.com

1986 drama films
American drama television films
Films about eating disorders
1986 television films
1986 films
Films directed by Arthur Allan Seidelman
1980s English-language films